Reawla is a hamlet in Penwith district in Cornwall. It is in the civil parish of Gwinear-Gwithian.

The name Reawla comes from the Cornish language words riwel, meaning 'royal', and la, meaning 'place'.

References

External links

Villages in Cornwall